Gerrit Johan van Leeuwen (1756 – 1825), was a 19th-century painter from the Northern Netherlands.

Biography
He was born in Arnhem and trained in Haarlem where he was a pupil of Wybrand Hendriks. He returned to Arnhem where he became a successful fruit and flower painter and respected director of the drawing academy there.
He died in Arnhem.

References

Gerrit Johan van Leeuwen on Artnet

1756 births
1825 deaths
19th-century Dutch painters
Dutch male painters
People from Arnhem
19th-century Dutch male artists